Two ships of the Royal Navy have been called HMS Sabine after the ancient Italian tribe:

 HMS Sabine was the French 16-gun  Requin that  captured on 28 July 1808 in the Mediterranean; she was sold in 1818.
 HMS Sabine was an iron screw gunboat launched as HMS Sabrina in 1876. She was renamed HMS Sabine in 1916 on conversion to a diving tender. She was renamed again, to HMS Vivid, in 1920 before being sold in 1922.

Two other vessels named Sabine also served the Royal Navy.
Sabine was a fishing trawler of 118grt, built in 1888 and registered in Aberdeen. The Admiralty requisitioned her in 1917 for the Fishery Reserve. She was commissioned and flew the White Ensign; she continued commercial fishing, but under Navy control until 1919, when the Admiralty returned her to her owners. 
Sabine was built in America in 1917 and the Admiralty purchased her in 1940 as a rescue tug. On 3 June 1941 she rescued the crew of Fleet Tender C (Marmari III), which had struck the wreck of Ahamo and had subsequently been torpedoed.

References

Royal Navy ship names